Rackerby (formerly, Hansonville) is a census-designated place straddling the border between Butte County and Yuba County in California. Rackerby's population was 204 at the 2010 census.

History
Rackerby post office opened in 1892 in Yuba County, moved to Butte County in 1930, and moved back in 1934.  The name is in honor of William M. Rackerby, its first postmaster.

Demographics
At the 2010 census Rackerby had a population of 204. The racial makeup of Rackerby was 193 (94.6%) White, 0 (0.0%) African American, 1 (0.5%) Native American, 0 (0.0%) Asian, 0 (0.0%) Pacific Islander, 3 (1.5%) from other races, and 7 (3.4%) from two or more races. Hispanic or Latino of any race were 18 people (8.8%).

The whole population lived in households, no one lived in non-institutionalized group quarters and no one was institutionalized.

There were 86 households, 20 (23.3%) had children under the age of 18 living in them, 47 (54.7%) were opposite-sex married couples living together, 10 (11.6%) had a female householder with no husband present, 4 (4.7%) had a male householder with no wife present.  There were 8 (9.3%) unmarried opposite-sex partnerships, and 3 (3.5%) same-sex married couples or partnerships. 16 households (18.6%) were one person and 6 (7.0%) had someone living alone who was 65 or older. The average household size was 2.37.  There were 61 families (70.9% of households); the average family size was 2.67.

The age distribution was 39 people (19.1%) under the age of 18, 14 people (6.9%) aged 18 to 24, 44 people (21.6%) aged 25 to 44, 70 people (34.3%) aged 45 to 64, and 37 people (18.1%) who were 65 or older.  The median age was 47.3 years. For every 100 females, there were 100.0 males.  For every 100 females age 18 and over, there were 106.3 males.

There were 106 housing units at an average density of ,of which 86 were occupied, 63 (73.3%) by the owners and 23 (26.7%) by renters.  The homeowner vacancy rate was 1.5%; the rental vacancy rate was 17.9%.  147 people (72.1% of the population) lived in owner-occupied housing units and 57 people (27.9%) lived in rental housing units.

References

Census-designated places in Butte County, California
Census-designated places in Yuba County, California
Census-designated places in California